A refrigerator, colloquially fridge, is a commercial and home appliance consisting of a thermally insulated compartment and a heat pump (mechanical, electronic or chemical) that transfers heat from its inside to its external environment so that its inside is cooled to a temperature below the room temperature. Refrigeration is an essential food storage technique around the world. The lower temperature lowers the reproduction rate of bacteria, so the refrigerator reduces the rate of spoilage. A refrigerator maintains a temperature a few degrees above the freezing point of water. A similar device that maintains a temperature below the freezing point of water is called a freezer. The refrigerator replaced the icebox, which had been a common household appliance for almost a century and a half.

The first cooling systems for food involved ice. Artificial refrigeration began in the mid-1750s, and developed in the early 1800s. In 1834, the first working vapor-compression refrigeration system was built. The first commercial ice-making machine was invented in 1854. In 1913, refrigerators for home use were invented. In 1923 Frigidaire introduced the first self-contained unit. The introduction of Freon in the 1920s expanded the refrigerator market during the 1930s. Home freezers as separate compartments (larger than necessary just for ice cubes) were introduced in 1940. Frozen foods, previously a luxury item, became commonplace.

Freezer units are used in households as well as in industry and commerce. Commercial refrigerator and freezer units were in use for almost 40 years prior to the common home models. The freezer-over-refrigerator style had been the basic style since the 1940s, until modern, side-by-side refrigerators broke the trend. A vapor compression cycle is used in most household refrigerators, refrigerator–freezers and freezers. Newer refrigerators may include automatic defrosting, chilled water, and ice from a dispenser in the door.

Domestic refrigerators and freezers for food storage are made in a range of sizes. Among the smallest are Peltier-type refrigerators designed to chill beverages. Refrigerators and freezers may be free-standing, or built into a kitchen. The refrigerator allows the modern household to keep food fresh for longer than before. Freezers allow people to buy perishable food in bulk and eat it at leisure, and make bulk purchases.

History

Technology development

Ancient origins

Ancient Iranians were among the first to invent a form of large evaporative cooler called yakhchāls using subterranean storage spaces, a large domed above-ground structure made with thick walls and outfitted with wind catchers (called "badgirs"), walled off further into a series of "qanats", a kind of aqueduct used in Ancient Iran.

Pre-electric refrigeration

In modern times, before the invention of the modern electric refrigerator, icehouses and iceboxes were used to provide cool storage for most of the year. Placed near freshwater lakes or packed with snow and ice during the winter, they were once very common. Natural means are still used to cool foods today. On mountainsides, runoff from melting snow is a convenient way to cool drinks, and during the winter one can keep milk fresh much longer just by keeping it outdoors. The word "refrigeratory" was used at least as early as the 17th century.

Artificial refrigeration
The history of artificial refrigeration began when Scottish professor William Cullen designed a small refrigerating machine in 1755. Cullen used a pump to create a partial vacuum over a container of diethyl ether, which then boiled, absorbing heat from the surrounding air. The experiment even created a small amount of ice, but had no practical application at that time.

In 1805, American inventor Oliver Evans described a closed vapor-compression refrigeration cycle for the production of ice by ether under vacuum. In 1820, the British scientist Michael Faraday liquefied ammonia and other gases by using high pressures and low temperatures, and in 1834, an American expatriate in Great Britain, Jacob Perkins, built the first working vapor-compression refrigeration system. It was a closed-cycle device that could operate continuously. A similar attempt was made in 1842, by American physician, John Gorrie, who built a working prototype, but it was a commercial failure. American engineer Alexander Twining took out a British patent in 1850 for a vapor compression system that used ether.

The first practical vapor compression refrigeration system was built by James Harrison, a Scottish Australian. His 1856 patent was for a vapor compression system using ether, alcohol or ammonia. He built a mechanical ice-making machine in 1851 on the banks of the Barwon River at Rocky Point in Geelong, Victoria, and his first commercial ice-making machine followed in 1854. Harrison also introduced commercial vapor-compression refrigeration to breweries and meat packing houses, and by 1861, a dozen of his systems were in operation.

The first gas absorption refrigeration system (compressor-less and powered by a heat-source) was developed by Edward  Toussaint of France in 1859 and patented in 1860.  It used gaseous ammonia dissolved in water ("aqua ammonia").

Carl von Linde, an engineering professor at the Technological University Munich in Germany, patented an improved method of liquefying gases in 1876. His new process made possible the use of gases such as ammonia (NH3), sulfur dioxide (SO2) and methyl chloride (CH3Cl) as refrigerants, which were widely used for that purpose until the late 1920s despite safety concerns.

Electric refrigerators 

In 1894, Hungarian inventor and industrialist István Röck started to manufacture a large industrial ammonia refrigerator which was powered by electric compressors (together with the Esslingen Machine Works). Its electric compressors were manufactured by the Ganz Works.  At the 1896 Millennium Exhibition, Röck and the Esslingen Machine Works presented a 6-tonne capacity artificial ice producing plant. In 1906, the first large Hungarian cold store (with a capacity of 3,000 tonnes, the largest in Europe) opened in Tóth Kálmán Street, Budapest, the machine was manufactured by the Ganz Works. Until nationalisation after the Second World War, large-scale industrial refrigerator production in Hungary was in the hands of Röck and Ganz Works.

Commercial refrigerator and freezer units, which go by many other names, were in use for almost 40 years prior to the common home models. They used gas systems such as ammonia (R-717) or sulfur dioxide (R-764), which occasionally leaked, making them unsafe for home use. Practical household refrigerators were introduced in 1915 and gained wider acceptance in the United States in the 1930s as prices fell and non-toxic, non-flammable synthetic refrigerants such as Freon-12 (R-12) were introduced.  However, R-12 proved to be damaging to the ozone layer, causing governments to issue a ban on its use in new refrigerators and air-conditioning systems in 1994. The less harmful replacement for R-12, R-134a (tetrafluoroethane), has been in common use since 1990, but R-12 is still found in many old systems.

A common commercial refrigerator is the glass fronted beverage cooler. These type of appliances are typically designed for specific re-load conditions meaning that they generally have a larger cooling system. This ensures that they are able to cope with a large throughput of drinks and frequent door opening.  As a result, it is common for these types of commercial refrigerators to have energy consumption of over 4 kWh per day.Commercial refrigerators efficiency is primarily dependent on the compressor that moves. Refrigerators can be able to cause technical harm to the compressor in certain cases. It can be restored or mounted again, depending on the degree of damage. Other kinds of damage, such as a cooler leak, can go undetected until serious problems arise. Health concerns are chief among these problems, with refrigerant poisoning being the most alarming. In order to detect harmful leaks early on, refrigerant levels need to be regularly monitored. Regular routine maintenance should avoid the risk of keeping food products at the right temperature. Even the slightest change in circumstances can affect consistency, resulting in breaches of food safety and potential penalties.

Residential refrigerators

In 1913, the first electric refrigerators for home and domestic use were invented and produced by Fred W. Wolf of Fort Wayne, Indiana, with models consisting of a unit that was mounted on top of an ice box. His first device, produced over the next few years in several hundred units, was called DOMELRE. In 1914, engineer Nathaniel B. Wales of Detroit, Michigan, introduced an idea for a practical electric refrigeration unit, which later became the basis for the Kelvinator. A self-contained refrigerator, with a compressor on the bottom of the cabinet was invented by Alfred Mellowes in 1916. Mellowes produced this refrigerator commercially but was bought out by William C. Durant in 1918, who started the Frigidaire company to mass-produce refrigerators. In 1918, Kelvinator company introduced the first refrigerator with any type of automatic control. The absorption refrigerator was invented by Baltzar von Platen and Carl Munters from Sweden in 1922, while they were still students at the Royal Institute of Technology in Stockholm. It became a worldwide success and was commercialized by Electrolux. Other pioneers included Charles Tellier, David Boyle, and Raoul Pictet. Carl von Linde was the first to patent and make a practical and compact refrigerator.

These home units usually required the installation of the mechanical parts, motor and compressor, in the basement or an adjacent room while the cold box was located in the kitchen. There was a 1922 model that consisted of a wooden cold box, water-cooled compressor, an ice cube tray and a  compartment, and cost $714. (A 1922 Model-T Ford cost about $476.) By 1923, Kelvinator held 80 percent of the market for electric refrigerators. Also in 1923 Frigidaire introduced the first self-contained unit. About this same time porcelain-covered metal cabinets began to appear. Ice cube trays were introduced more and more during the 1920s; up to this time freezing was not an auxiliary function of the modern refrigerator.

The first refrigerator to see widespread use was the General Electric "Monitor-Top" refrigerator introduced in 1927, so-called, by the public, because of its resemblance to the gun turret on the ironclad warship USS Monitor of the 1860s. The compressor assembly, which emitted a great deal of heat, was placed above the cabinet, and enclosed by a decorative ring. Over a million units were produced. As the refrigerating medium, these refrigerators used either sulfur dioxide, which is corrosive to the eyes and may cause loss of vision, painful skin burns and lesions, or methyl formate, which is highly flammable, harmful to the eyes, and toxic if inhaled or ingested.

The introduction of Freon in the 1920s expanded the refrigerator market during the 1930s and provided a safer, low-toxicity alternative to previously used refrigerants.  Separate freezers became common during the 1940s; the term for the unit, popular at the time, was deep freeze. These devices, or appliances, did not go into mass production for use in the home until after World War II. The 1950s and 1960s saw technical advances like automatic defrosting and automatic ice making. More efficient refrigerators were developed in the 1970s and 1980s, even though environmental issues led to the banning of very effective (Freon) refrigerants. Early refrigerator models (from 1916) had a cold compartment for ice cube trays. From the late 1920s fresh vegetables were successfully processed through freezing by the Postum Company (the forerunner of General Foods), which had acquired the technology when it bought the rights to Clarence Birdseye's successful fresh freezing methods.

Styles of refrigerators 
In the early 1950s most refrigerators were white, but from the mid-1950s to the present day, designers and manufacturers have put color onto refrigerators. In the late-1950s/early-1960s, pastel colors like turquoise and pink became popular, and brushed chrome-plating (similar to a stainless steel finish) was available on some models. In the late 1960s and throughout the 1970s, earth tone colors were popular, including Harvest Gold, Avocado Green and almond. In the 1980s, black became fashionable. In the late 1990s stainless steel came into vogue. Since 1961 the Color Marketing Group has attempted to coordinate the colors of appliances and other consumer goods.

Freezer

Freezer units are used in households and in industry and commerce. Food stored at or below  is safe indefinitely. Domestic freezers can be included as a separate compartment in a refrigerator, or can be a separate appliance. Domestic freezers may be either upright, resembling a refrigerator, or chest freezers, wider than tall with the lid or door on top, sacrificing convenience for efficiency and partial immunity to power outages. Many modern upright freezers come with an ice dispenser built into their door. Some upscale models include thermostat displays and controls.

Home freezers as separate compartments (larger than necessary just for ice cubes), or as separate units, were introduced in the United States in 1940. Frozen foods, previously a luxury item, became commonplace.

In 1955 the domestic deep freezer, which was cold enough to allow the owners to freeze fresh food themselves rather than buying food already frozen with Clarence Birdseye's process, went on sale.

Refrigerator technologies

Compressor refrigerators
A vapor compression cycle is used in most household refrigerators, refrigerator–freezers and freezers. In this cycle, a circulating refrigerant such as R134a enters a compressor as low-pressure vapor at or slightly below the temperature of the refrigerator interior. The vapor is compressed and exits the compressor as high-pressure superheated vapor. The superheated vapor travels under pressure through coils or tubes that make up the condenser; the coils or tubes are passively cooled by exposure to air in the room. The condenser cools the vapor, which liquefies. As the refrigerant leaves the condenser, it is still under pressure but is now only slightly above room temperature. This liquid refrigerant is forced through a metering or throttling device, also known as an expansion valve (essentially a pin-hole sized constriction in the tubing) to an area of much lower pressure. The sudden decrease in pressure results in explosive-like flash evaporation of a portion (typically about half) of the liquid. The latent heat absorbed by this flash evaporation is drawn mostly from adjacent still-liquid refrigerant, a phenomenon known as auto-refrigeration. This cold and partially vaporized refrigerant continues through the coils or tubes of the evaporator unit. A fan blows air from the compartment ("box air") across these coils or tubes and the refrigerant completely vaporizes, drawing further latent heat from the box air. This cooled air is returned to the refrigerator or freezer compartment, and so keeps the box air cold. Note that the cool air in the refrigerator or freezer is still warmer than the refrigerant in the evaporator. Refrigerant leaves the evaporator, now fully vaporized and slightly heated, and returns to the compressor inlet to continue the cycle.

Modern domestic refrigerators are extremely reliable because motor and compressor are integrated within a welded container, "sealed unit", with greatly reduced likelihood of leakage or contamination.  By comparison, externally-coupled refrigeration compressors, such as those in automobile air conditioning, inevitably leak fluid and lubricant past the shaft seals.  This leads to a requirement for periodic recharging and, if ignored, possible compressor failure.

Dual compartment designs
Refrigerators with two compartments need special design to control the cooling of refrigerator or freezer compartments. Typically, the compressors and condenser coils are mounted at the top of the cabinet, with a single fan to cool them both. This arrangement has a few downsides: each compartment cannot be controlled independently and the more humid refrigerator air is mixed with the dry freezer air.

Multiple manufacturers offer dual compressor models.  These models have separate freezer and refrigerator compartments that operate independently of each other, sometimes mounted within a single cabinet.  Each has its own separate compressor, condenser and evaporator coils, insulation, thermostat, and door.

A hybrid between the two designs is using a separate fan for each compartment, the Dual Fan approach. Doing so allows for separate control and airflow on a single compressor system.

Absorption refrigerators
An absorption refrigerator works differently from a compressor refrigerator, using a source of heat, such as combustion of liquefied petroleum gas, solar thermal energy or an electric heating element. These heat sources are much quieter than the compressor motor in a typical refrigerator. A fan or pump might be the only mechanical moving parts; reliance on convection is considered impractical.

Other uses of an absorption refrigerator (or "chiller") include large systems used in office buildings or complexes such as hospitals and universities. These large systems are used to chill a brine solution that is circulated through the building.

Peltier effect refrigerators
The Peltier effect uses electricity to pump heat directly; refrigerators employing this system are sometimes used for camping, or in situations where noise is not acceptable. They can be totally silent (if a fan for air circulation is not fitted) but are less energy-efficient than other methods.

Ultra-low temperature refrigerators
"Ultra-cold" or "ultra-low temperature (ULT)" (typically −80°C or −86°C) freezers, as used for storing biological samples, also generally employ two stages of cooling, but in cascade. The lower temperature stage uses methane, or a similar gas, as a refrigerant, with its condenser kept at around −40°C by a second stage which uses a more conventional refrigerant. Well known brands include Forma and Revco (both now Thermo Scientific). For much lower temperatures, laboratories usually purchase liquid nitrogen (−196 °C), kept in a Dewar flask, into which the samples are suspended. Cryogenic chest freezers can achieve temperatures of down to −150°C, and may include a liquid nitrogen backup.

Other refrigerators
Alternatives to the vapor-compression cycle not in current mass production include:

 Acoustic cooling
 Air cycle
 Magnetic cooling
 Malone engine
 Pulse tube
 Stirling cycle
 Thermoelectric cooling 
 Thermionic cooling
 Vortex tube
 Water cycle systems.

Architecture
Many modern refrigerator/freezers have the freezer on top and the refrigerator on the bottom. Most refrigerator-freezers—except for manual defrost models or cheaper units—use what appears to be two thermostats. Only the refrigerator compartment is properly temperature controlled. When the refrigerator gets too warm, the thermostat starts the cooling process and a fan circulates the air around the freezer. During this time, the refrigerator also gets colder. The freezer control knob only controls the amount of air that flows into the refrigerator via a damper system. Changing the refrigerator temperature will inadvertently change the freezer temperature in the opposite direction. Changing the freezer temperature will have no effect on the refrigerator temperature. The freezer control may also be adjusted to compensate for any refrigerator adjustment.

This means the refrigerator may become too warm. However, because only enough air is diverted to the refrigerator compartment, the freezer usually re-acquires the set temperature quickly, unless the door is opened. When a door is opened, either in the refrigerator or the freezer, the fan in some units stops immediately to prevent excessive frost build up on the freezer's evaporator coil, because this coil is cooling two areas. When the freezer reaches temperature, the unit cycles off, no matter what the refrigerator temperature is. Modern computerized refrigerators do not use the damper system. The computer manages fan speed for both compartments, although air is still blown from the freezer.

Features 

Newer refrigerators may include:
Automatic defrosting
A power failure warning that alerts the user by flashing a temperature display. It may display the maximum temperature reached during the power failure, and whether frozen food has defrosted or may contain harmful bacteria.
Chilled water and ice from a dispenser in the door. Water and ice dispensing became available in the 1970s. In some refrigerators, the process of making ice is built-in so the user doesn't have to manually use ice trays. Some refrigerators have water chillers and water filtration systems.
Cabinet rollers that lets the refrigerator roll out for easier cleaning
Adjustable shelves and trays
A status indicator that notifies when it is time to change the water filter
An in-door ice caddy, which relocates the ice-maker storage to the freezer door and saves approximately 60 litres (2 cu ft) of usable freezer space. It is also removable, and helps to prevent ice-maker clogging.
A cooling zone in the refrigerator door shelves. Air from the freezer section is diverted to the refrigerator door, to cool milk or juice stored in the door shelf.
A drop down door built into the refrigerator main door, giving easy access to frequently used items such as milk, thus saving energy by not having to open the main door.
A Fast Freeze function to rapidly cool foods by running the compressor for a predetermined amount of time and thus temporarily lowering the freezer temperature below normal operating levels. It is recommended to use this feature several hours before adding more than 1 kg of unfrozen food to the freezer. For freezers without this feature, lowering the temperature setting to the coldest will have the same effect.
 Freezer Defrost: Early freezer units accumulated ice crystals around the freezing units. This was a result of humidity introduced into the units when the doors to the freezer were opened condensing on the cold parts, then freezing. This frost buildup required periodic thawing ("defrosting") of the units to maintain their efficiency. Manual Defrost (referred to as Cyclic) units are still available. Advances in automatic defrosting eliminating the thawing task were introduced in the 1950s, but are not universal, due to energy performance and cost. These units used a counter that only defrosted the freezer compartment (Freezer Chest) when a specific number of door openings had been made. The units were just a small timer combined with an electrical heater wire that heated the freezer's walls for a short amount of time to remove all traces of frost/frosting. Also, early units featured freezer compartments located within the larger refrigerator, and accessed by opening the refrigerator door, and then the smaller internal freezer door; units featuring an entirely separate freezer compartment were introduced in the early 1960s, becoming the industry standard by the middle of that decade.

 Butter heater: In the early 1950s, the butter conditioner's patent was filed and published by the inventor Nave Alfred E. This feature was supposed to "provide a new and improved food storage receptacle for storing butter or the like which may quickly and easily be removed from the refrigerator cabinet for the purpose of cleaning." Because of the high interest to the invention, companies in UK, New Zealand, and Australia started to include the feature into the mass fridge production and soon it became a symbol of the local culture. However, not long after that it was removed from production as according to the companies this was the only way for them to meet new ecology regulations and they found it inefficient to have a heat generating device inside a fridge.

Later advances included automatic ice units and self compartmentalized freezing units.

Types of domestic refrigerators 
Domestic refrigerators and freezers for food storage are made in a range of sizes. Among the smallest is a 4 L Peltier refrigerator advertised as being able to hold 6 cans of beer. A large domestic refrigerator stands as tall as a person and may be about 1 m wide with a capacity of 600 L. Some models for small households fit under kitchen work surfaces, usually about 86 cm high. Refrigerators may be combined with freezers, either stacked with refrigerator or freezer above, below, or side by side. A refrigerator without a frozen food storage compartment may have a small section just to make ice cubes. Freezers may have drawers to store food in, or they may have no divisions (chest freezers).

Refrigerators and freezers may be free-standing, or built into a kitchen.

Three distinct classes of refrigerator are common:

Compressor refrigerators
Compressor refrigerators are by far the most common type; they make a noticeable noise, but are most efficient and give greatest cooling effect. Portable compressor refrigerators for recreational vehicle (RV) and camping use are expensive but effective and reliable. Refrigeration units for commercial and industrial applications can be made in various sizes, shapes and styles to fit customer needs. Commercial and industrial refrigerators may have their compressors located away from the cabinet (similar to split system air conditioners) to reduce noise nuisance and reduce the load on air conditioning in hot weather.

Absorption refrigerator
Absorption refrigerators may be used in caravans and trailers, and dwellings lacking electricity, such as farms or rural cabins, where they have a long history. They may be powered by any heat source: gas (natural or propane) or kerosene being common. Models made for camping and RV use often have the option of running (inefficiently) on 12 volt battery power.

Peltier refrigerators
Peltier refrigerators are powered by electricity, usually 12 volt DC, but mains-powered wine coolers are available. Peltier refrigerators are inexpensive but inefficient and become progressively more inefficient with increased cooling effect; much of this inefficiency may be related to the temperature differential across the short distance between the "hot" and "cold" sides of the Peltier cell. Peltier refrigerators generally use heat sinks and fans to lower this differential; the only noise produced comes from the fan. Reversing the polarity of the voltage applied to the Peltier cells results in a heating rather than cooling effect.

Other specialized cooling mechanisms may be used for cooling, but have not been applied to domestic or commercial refrigerators.

Magnetic refrigerator
Magnetic refrigerators are refrigerators that work on the magnetocaloric effect. The cooling effect is triggered by placing a metal alloy in a magnetic field.
Acoustic refrigerators are refrigerators that use resonant linear reciprocating motors/alternators to generate a sound that is converted to heat and cold using compressed helium gas. The heat is discarded and the cold is routed to the refrigerator.

Energy efficiency 

In a house without air-conditioning (space heating and/or cooling) refrigerators consumed more energy than any other home device. In the early 1990s a competition was held among the major manufacturers to encourage energy efficiency. Current US models that are Energy Star qualified use 50% less energy than the average models made in 1974. The most energy-efficient unit made in the US consumes about half a kilowatt-hour per day (equivalent to 20 W continuously). But even ordinary units are quite efficient; some smaller units use less than 0.2 kWh per day (equivalent to 8 W continuously).
Larger units, especially those with large freezers and icemakers, may use as much as 4 kW·h per day (equivalent to 170 W continuously).
The European Union uses a letter-based mandatory energy efficiency rating label instead of the Energy Star; thus EU refrigerators at the point of sale are labelled according to how energy-efficient they are.

For US refrigerators, the Consortium on Energy Efficiency (CEE) further differentiates between Energy Star qualified refrigerators. Tier 1 refrigerators are those that are 20% to 24.9% more efficient than the Federal minimum standards set by the National Appliance Energy Conservation Act (NAECA). Tier 2 are those that are 25% to 29.9% more efficient. Tier 3 is the highest qualification, for those refrigerators that are at least 30% more efficient than Federal standards. About 82% of the Energy Star qualified refrigerators are Tier 1, with 13% qualifying as Tier 2, and just 5% at Tier 3.

Besides the standard style of compressor refrigeration used in normal household refrigerators and freezers, there are technologies such as absorption refrigeration and magnetic refrigeration. Although these designs generally use a much larger amount of energy compared to compressor refrigeration, other qualities such as silent operation or the ability to use gas can favor these refrigeration units in small enclosures, a mobile environment or in environments where unit failure would lead to devastating consequences.

Many refrigerators made in the 1930s and 1940s were far more efficient than most that were made later. This is partly attributable to the addition of new features, such as auto-defrost, that reduced efficiency. Additionally, after World War 2, refrigerator style became more important than efficiency. This was especially true in the US in the 1970s, when side-by-side models (known as American fridgefreezers outside of the US) with ice dispensers and water chillers became popular. However, the reduction in efficiency also arose partly from reduction in the amount of insulation to cut costs.

Today

Because of the introduction of new energy efficiency standards, refrigerators made today are much more efficient than those made in the 1930s; they consume the same amount of energy while being three times as large.

Some sites recommend cleaning condenser coils every month or so on units with coils on the rear, to add life to the coils and not suffer an unnoticeable deterioration in efficiency over an extended period, the unit should be able to ventilate or "breathe" with adequate spaces around the front, back, sides and above the unit. If the refrigerator uses a fan to keep the condenser cool, then this must be cleaned or serviced, at per individual manufactures recommendations.

Auto defrosting 

Frost-free refrigerators or freezers use electric fans to cool the appropriate compartment. This could be called a "fan forced" refrigerator, whereas manual defrost units rely on colder air lying at the bottom, versus the warm air at the top to achieve adequate cooling. The air is drawn in through an inlet duct and passed through the evaporator where it is cooled, the air is then circulated throughout the cabinet via a series of ducts and vents. Because the air passing the evaporator is supposedly warm and moist, frost begins to form on the evaporator (especially on a freezer's evaporator). In cheaper and/or older models, a defrost cycle is controlled via a mechanical timer. This timer is set to shut off the compressor and fan and energize a heating element located near or around the evaporator for about 15 to 30 minutes at every 6 to 12 hours. This melts any frost or ice build-up and allows the refrigerator to work normally once more. It is believed that frost free units have a lower tolerance for frost, due to their air-conditioner-like evaporator coils. Therefore, if a door is left open accidentally (especially the freezer), the defrost system may not remove all frost, in this case, the freezer (or refrigerator) must be defrosted. 

If the defrosting system melts all the ice before the timed defrosting period ends, then a small device (called a defrost limiter) acts like a thermostat and shuts off the heating element to prevent too large a temperature fluctuation, it also prevents hot blasts of air when the system starts again, should it finish defrosting early. On some early frost-free models, the defrost limiter also sends a signal to the defrost timer to start the compressor and fan as soon as it shuts off the heating element before the timed defrost cycle ends. When the defrost cycle is completed, the compressor and fan are allowed to cycle back on. 

Frost-free refrigerators, including some early frost-free refrigerators/freezers that used a cold plate in their refrigerator section instead of airflow from the freezer section, generally don't shut off their refrigerator fans during defrosting. This allows consumers to leave food in the main refrigerator compartment uncovered, and also helps keep vegetables moist. This method also helps reduce energy consumption, because the refrigerator is above freeze point and can pass the warmer-than-freezing air through the evaporator or cold plate to aid the defrosting cycle.

Inverter 

With the advent of digital inverter compressors, the energy consumption is even further reduced than a single-speed induction motor compressor, and thus contributes far less in the way of greenhouse gases.

The energy consumption of a refrigerator is also dependent on the type of refrigeration being done. For instance, Inverter Refrigerators consume comparatively less energy than a typical non-inverter refrigerator.  In an inverter refrigerator, the compressor is used conditionally on requirement basis. For instance, an inverter refrigerator might use less energy during the winters than it does during the summers. This is because the compressor works for a shorter time than it does during the summers.

Further, newer models of inverter compressor refrigerators take in to account various external and internal conditions to adjust the compressor speed and thus optimize cooling and energy consumption. Most of them use at least 4 sensors which help detect variance in external temperature, internal temperature owing to opening of the refrigerator door or keeping new food inside; humidity and usage patterns. Depending on the sensor inputs, the compressor adjusts its speed. For example, if door is opened or new food is kept, the sensor detects an increase in temperature inside the cabin and signals the compressor to increase its speed till a pre-determined temperature is attained. After which, the compressor runs at a minimum speed to just maintain the internal temperature. The compressor typically runs between 1200 and 4500 rpm.
Inverter compressors not only optimizes cooling but is also superior in terms of durability and energy efficiency.
A device consumes maximum energy and undergoes maximum wear and tear when it switches itself on. As an inverter compressor never switches itself off and instead runs on varying speed, it minimizes wear and tear and energy usage.
LG  played a significant role in improving inverter compressors as we know it by reducing the friction points in the compressor and thus introducing Linear Inverter Compressors. Conventionally, all domestic refrigerators use a reciprocating drive which is connected to the piston. But in a linear inverter compressor, the piston which is a permanent magnet is suspended between two electromagnets. The AC changes the magnetic poles of the electromagnet, which results in the push and pull that compresses the refrigerant.  LG claims that this helps reduce energy consumption by 32% and noise by 25% compared to their conventional compressors.

Form factor 
The phycial design of refrigerators also plays a large part in its energy efficiency. The most efficient is the chest-style freezer, as its top-opening design minimizes convection when opening the doors, reducing the amount of warm moist air entering the freezer. On the other hand, in-door ice dispensers cause more heat leakage, contributing to an increase in energy consumption.

Effect on lifestyle 
The refrigerator allows households to keep food fresh for longer than before. The most notable improvement is for meat and other highly perishable wares, which needed to be refined to gain anything resembling shelf life.  (On the other hand, refrigerators and freezers can also be stocked with processed, quick-cook foods that are less healthy.) Refrigeration in transit makes it possible to enjoy food from distant places.

Dairy products, meats, fish, poultry and vegetables can be kept refrigerated in the same space within the kitchen (although raw meat should be kept separate from other food for reasons of hygiene).

Freezers allow people to buy food in bulk and eat it at leisure, and bulk purchases may save money. Ice cream, a popular commodity of the 20th century, could previously only be obtained by traveling to where the product was made and eating it on the spot. Now it is a common food item. Ice on demand not only adds to the enjoyment of cold drinks, but is useful for first-aid, and for cold packs that can be kept frozen for picnics or in case of emergency.

Temperature zones and ratings

Residential units

The capacity of a refrigerator is measured in either liters or cubic feet. Typically the volume of a combined refrigerator-freezer is split with 1/3rds to 1/4th of the volume allocated to the freezer although these values are highly variable.

Some refrigerators must be within certain external temperature parameters to run properly. This can be an issue when placing units in an unfinished area, such as a garage.

Some refrigerators are now divided into four zones to store different types of food:
 (freezer)
 (meat zone)
 (cooling zone)
 (crisper)

European freezers, and refrigerators with a freezer compartment, have a four star rating system to grade freezers.

Three (or fewer) stars are used for frozen food compartments that are only suitable for storing frozen food; introducing fresh food into such a compartment is likely to result in unacceptable temperature rises. This difference in categorization is shown in the design of the 4-star logo, where the "standard" three stars are displayed in a box using "positive" colours, denoting the same normal operation as a 3-star freezer, and the fourth star showing the additional fresh food/fast freeze function is prefixed to the box in "negative" colours or with other distinct formatting. 

Most European refrigerators include a moist cold refrigerator section (which does require (automatic) defrosting at irregular intervals) and a (rarely frost free) freezer section.

Commercial refrigeration temperatures 
(from warmest to coolest)
 Refrigerators  , and not greater than maximum refrigerator temperature at 
 Freezer, Reach-in  
 Freezer, Walk-in  
 Freezer, Ice Cream

Disposal 

An increasingly important environmental concern is the disposal of old refrigerators—initially because freon coolant damages the ozone layer—but as older generation refrigerators wear out, the destruction of CFC-bearing insulation also causes concern. Modern refrigerators usually use a refrigerant called HFC-134a (1,1,1,2-Tetrafluoroethane), which does not deplete the ozone layer, unlike Freon. R-134a is becoming much rarer in Europe. Newer refrigerants are being used instead. The main refrigerant now used is R-600a (also known as isobutane), which has a smaller effect on the atmosphere if released. There have been reports of refrigerators exploding if the refrigerant leaks isobutane in the presence of a spark.  If the coolant leaks into the fridge, at times when the door is not being opened (such as overnight) the concentration of coolant in the air within the fridge can build up to form an explosive mixture that can be ignited either by a spark from the thermostat or when the light comes on as the door is opened, resulting in documented cases of serious property damage and injury or even death from the resulting explosion.

Disposal of discarded refrigerators is regulated, often mandating the removal of doors for safety reasons. Children playing hide-and-seek have been asphyxiated while hiding inside discarded refrigerators, particularly older models with latching doors, in a phenomenon called refrigerator death. Since 2 August 1956, under U.S. federal law, refrigerator doors are no longer permitted to latch and they can be opened from the inside. Modern units use a magnetic door gasket that holds the door sealed but allows it to be pushed open from the inside. This gasket was invented, developed and manufactured by Max Baermann (1903–1984) of Bergisch Gladbach/Germany.

Regarding total life-cycle costs, many governments offer incentives to encourage recycling of old refrigerators. One example is the Phoenix refrigerator program launched in Australia. This government incentive picked up old refrigerators, paying their owners for "donating" the refrigerator. The refrigerator was then refurbished, with new door seals, a thorough cleaning and the removal of items, such as the cover that is strapped to the back of many older units. The resulting refrigerators, now over 10% more efficient, were then distributed to low income families.

Gallery

See also 

 Auto-defrost
 Cold chain
 Continuous freezers
 Home automation
 Ice cream maker
 Ice famine
 Internet refrigerator
 KECO Industries, Inc. v. United States
 Kimchi refrigerator
 List of home appliances
 Pot-in-pot refrigerator
 Refrigerator death
 Refrigerator magnet
 Solar-powered refrigerator
 Star rating
 Water dispenser
 Wine cellar

References

Further reading
 Rees, Jonathan. Refrigeration Nation: A History of Ice, Appliances, and Enterprise in America (Johns Hopkins University Press; 2013) 256 pages

External links 

  Refrigerating apparatus
  Refrigerating apparatus
 The History of the Refrigerator and Freezers 
 Refrigerators, Canada Science and Technology Museum
 

20th-century inventions
Articles containing video clips
Australian inventions
Cooling technology
Food preservation
Food storage
Heat pumps
Home appliances
Home automation
Kitchen